Ghost Hunters is a platform game written by the Oliver twins for the Amstrad CPC and published by Codemasters in January 1987. It was also converted and released for the ZX Spectrum (1987) and Commodore 64 (1989) platforms. The game combines platform-style action with shooting gameplay similar to that found in the game Operation Wolf. The game is the second release by the Oliver twins, published when they were just seventeen years old and still going to school. It was conceived as a sequel to their first commercially successful game, Super Robin Hood, although it has little to do with this game other than using a modified version of its engine. The twins have credited the film Ghostbusters and the cartoon series Scooby-Doo for influencing the game.

Gameplay
Like their previous game, Super Robin Hood, the player controls a character (named Hunk Studbuckle) around the platform style screen using the keyboard or joystick. Uniquely, to attack the enemy, the player must temporarily use the cursor keys to move targeting cross-hairs to shoot ghosts and demons (in a similar manner to Operation Wolf), causing the character to stand still. This results in the player requiring to shoot the targets quickly and operate their character to move around the screen before more would appear. In addition to being able to walk, the character can also jump and climb ladders. In addition to enemies to be killed, the environment contains items that can be collected, including 'macho energy' top-ups and 'key' items that unlock further areas. The game is one of few available on the CPC and ZX Spectrum platforms to feature low resolution clips of human speech, although playing them was so CPU-intensive that the game was required to freeze for their duration.

Development
Codemasters paid the Oliver brothers £10,000 for the Amstrad CPC release and were offered another £10,000 for a ZX Spectrum release. However, the twins did not wish to produce a port by actually coding on the Spectrum, so to save time, they hired their friend Ivan Link to build a cable that links the Spectrum and the Amstrad. After which the twins produced the only software for the Spectrum they ever wrote called SPLINK (SPectrum and LINK) that enabled the code to be altered for the Amstrad and ported to the Spectrum.

Reception

After being released, both Spectrum and Amstrad versions went to No. 1 in commercial sales, this in combination with their previous No. 1 title, Super Robin Hood being ported to other platforms gave the Oliver twins a large amount of media exposure, being dubbed "The Oliver Twins - Whizz Kids".

References

 Oliver twins website

External links

1986 video games
Action video games
Amstrad CPC games
Codemasters games
Commodore 64 games
Europe-exclusive video games
Platform games
ZX Spectrum games
Video games developed in the United Kingdom